Idalus dorsalis is a moth of the family Erebidae. It was described by Adalbert Seitz in 1921. It is found in French Guiana and Colombia.

References

 

dorsalis
Moths described in 1921